Mr. TNA may refer to:

A.J. Styles, a professional wrestler who was voted "Mr. TNA" in 2003, 2004 and 2005 by the fans of Total Nonstop Action Wrestling (TNA), a promotion for which he frequently wrestles.
Christopher Daniels, who referred to himself as "Mr. TNA" throughout 2005 while feuding with A.J. Styles.
Kid Kash, who was released from TNA in 2005 due to attitude problems, and was subsequently dubbed "Mr. TNA" (for "Total Nonstop Attitude") by commentator Joey Styles.
Samoa Joe, voted "Mr. TNA" by the fans in 2006 and 2007.